Gim Jil (1422 – 24 February 1478), also often spelled Kim Chil, was a scholar-official of the early Joseon Dynasty.  He is remembered today primarily for his participation in, and betrayal of, the conspiracy led by the six martyred ministers.  

Gim was born to a family of the Andong Kim lineage. His father was a leader of the State Council of Joseon, and his paternal great-grandfather was Gim Sa-hyeong, who had been a leading supporter of Joseon Dynasty founder Taejo. He passed the gwageo examination in 1450, and served in various posts. He was appointed as saye (司藝) of the Seonggyungwan academy in 1455, a position of the fourth jeong rank. Together with other officials including Seong Sam-mun and Choe Hang, he came to be closely trusted by Munjong, the current king. Munjong died shortly thereafter, and entrusted these officials with looking after his young heir Danjong.

In 1455, Sejo overthrew Danjong and seized the throne for himself. Gim joined other high officials in a conspiracy to return Danjong to the throne. However, he lost heart at the last minute and betrayed the other conspirators to King Sejo. They were arrested and tortured, and many were killed together with their families.

Thereafter Gim was closely trusted by Sejo, and in 1459 he became vice-minister of the military and participated in revisions of national defense policy. In the 1460s, he rose to minister positions, first in the Ministry of Public Works and then in the Ministry of the Military.  In 1466, he served on the State Council of Joseon, a position to which he later returned; in the following year, he was made governor of Gyeongsang province.

His posthumous name was Munjeong (문정, 文靖). Gim eventually became a great-great-great-grandfather to Gim Ja-jeom.

Family 
 Great-Great-Great-Great-Great-Grandfather
 Gim Bang-gyeong (김방경, 金方慶) (1212 - 1300)
 Great-Great-Great-Great-Great-Great-Grandmother
 Lady Park of the Juksan Park clan (죽산 박씨)
 Great-Great-Great-Great-Grandfather
 Gim Sun (김순, 金恂) (1258 - 24 August 1321)
 Great-Great-Great-Great-Grandmother 
 Lady Heo of the Yangcheon Heo clan (양천 허씨)
 Great-Great-Great-Grandfather
 Gim Yeong-hu (김영후, 金永煦)
 Great-Great-Grandfather
 Gim Jang (김장, 金藏)
 Great-Grandfather
 Gim Sa-hyeong (김사형, 金士衡) (1341 - 1407)
 Grandfather
 Gim Seung (김승, 金陞)
 Father
 Gim Jong-suk (김종숙, 金宗淑) (? - 1470)
 Uncle - Gim Jong-jun (김종준, 金宗浚)
 Cousin - Gim Hwang (김황, 金璜)
 Mother
 Lady Lee (이씨)
 Grandfather - Lee Yang-jik (이양직, 李良直)
 Siblings 
 Older brother - Gim Jak (김작, 金碏)
 Older brother - Gim Jeok (김적, 金磧)
 Older brother - Gim Mu (김무, 金碔)
 Wife and children
 Lady Jeong of the Dongrae Jeong clan (동래 정씨, 東萊 鄭氏) (? - 1458)
 Son - Gim Ui-dong (김의동, 金義童)
 Son - Gim Ye-dong (김예동, 金禮童)
 Son - Gim Ji-dong (김지동, 金智童)
 Son - Gim Seong-dong (김성동, 金誠童) (1452 - 29 October 1495)
 Daughter-in-law - Lady Kang of the Jinju Kang clan (진주 강씨, 晉州 姜氏)
 Grandson - Gim Do (김도, 金淘)
 Grandson - Gim Ryeo (김려, 金濾)
 Grandson - Gim Yeon (김언, 金漹) (1495 - ?)
 Great-Grandson - Kim Yeok-ryeong (김억령, 金億齡) (1529 - ?)
 Granddaughter - Lady Kim of the Andong Kim clan (안동 김씨)
 Granddaughter - Lady Kim of the Andong Kim clan (안동 김씨)
 Granddaughter - Lady Kim of the Andong Kim clan (안동 김씨)
 Granddaughter - Lady Kim of the Andong Kim clan (안동 김씨)
 Son - Gim Yi-dong (김이동, 金利童)
 Daughter - Lady Kim of the Andong Kim clan (안동 김씨)
 Son-in-law - Yi Sik, Prince Burim (부림군 식, 富林君 湜)

See also
Joseon Dynasty politics
List of Joseon Dynasty people

References

External links
Empas entry

Joseon scholar-officials
1422 births
1478 deaths
Andong Kim clan